Alcyna is a genus of sea snails, marine gastropod mollusks in the family Trochidae, the top snails.

This genus was previously included in the family Phasianellidae.

Description
The minute shell is similar in form to Phasianella. The aperture is ovate. The columella has a heavy callus, bearing near the base a strong curved denticle projecting into the aperture. The outer lip is simple.

The imperforate shell is acutely ovate. The convex whorls are spirally lirate and longitudinally striate. The columella is callous, and toothed below. The outer lip is smooth or toothed within, and varicose exteriorly.

Species
Species within the genus Alcyna include:
 Alcyna acia Cotton, 1948
 Alcyna australis Hedley, 1907
 Alcyna exigua (Gould, A.A., 1861)
 Alcyna kingensis (Gabriel, 1956)
 Alcyna lifuensis Melvill & Standen, 1896
 Alcyna lucida (H. Adams, 1868)  
 Alcyna ocellata A. Adams, 1860
 Alcyna subangulata Pease, 1861

The following species were brought into synonymy:
 Alcyna flammulata Pilsbry, 1917: synonym of Alcyna subangulata Pease, 1861
 Alcyna kapiolaniae Pilsbry, 1917: synonym of Alcyna ocellata A. Adams, 1860
 Alcyna kuhnsi Pilsbry, 1917: synonym of Alcyna ocellata A. Adams, 1860
 Alcyna lepida A. Adams, 1860: synonym of Alcyna ocellata A. Adams, 1860
 Alcyna lineata Pease, 1869: synonym of Alcyna subangulata Pease, 1861
 Alcyna rubra Pease, 1861: synonym of Alcyna ocellata A. Adams, 1860
 Alcyna striata Pease, 1869: synonym of Alcyna subangulata Pease, 1861
 Alcyna subangulata flammulata Pilsbry, 1917: synonym of Alcyna subangulata Pease, 1861
 Alcyna subangulata virgata Pilsbry, 1917: synonym of Alcyna subangulata Pease, 1861
 Alcyna virgata Pilsbry, 1917: synonym of Alcyna subangulata Pease, 1861

References

 A. Adams (1860), On some new genera and species of Mollusca from Japan; The Annals and Magazine of Natural History, 1860

External links

 To GenBank 
 To World Register of Marine Species
 T. Sasaki, Micromolluscs in Japan: taxonomic composition, habitats, and future topics;  Zoosymposia, 2008
 V Héros, P Lozouet, P Maestrati et al.;  Mollusca of New Caledonia (2007); Institut de Recherche pour le Développement

 
Trochidae
Gastropod genera